Agonopterix cadurciella is a moth of the family Depressariidae. It is found in France.

The wingspan is 22–23 mm.

References

Moths described in 1914
Agonopterix
Moths of Europe